Robert Read (1870 – 15 February 1945) was a New Zealand cricketer. He played in two first-class matches for Wellington from 1899 to 1901.

See also
 List of Wellington representative cricketers

References

External links
 

1870 births
1945 deaths
New Zealand cricketers
Wellington cricketers
Cricketers from Greater London